Introducing is the debut album by Bombay Rockers released in 2003. 100,000 copies of their album have been sold. It also has now gone five times platinum. Introducing was critically acclaimed in Denmark and reached number one on the Album Chart. It was also number one for 15 consecutive weeks on the Indian Album Chart.

Track listing
  "Introducing" - 1:36
  "Rock Tha Party" - 3:36
  "Sexy Mama" - 3:32
  "Who Do You Love" - 3:49
  "Non Stop Feat Overseas" - 3:23
  "Substitute" - 3:32
  "Ari Ari Part-1" -  1:33
  "Wild Rose" - 3:37
  "Lovesick" - 3:38
  "Shimi Shake" Feat Matiaz - 3:46
  "Bring Your Girl Friend" - 4:12
  "X Rated Feat Overseas" - 3:27
  "Name And Number" - 3:33
  "Ari Ari Part-2" - 3:37
  "Outro" - 1:42

References

Bombay Rockers albums
2003 debut albums